Cobitis maroccana is a species of ray-finned fish in the family Cobitidae.

Taxonomy
The taxonomy of the Cobitis marrocana is as follows:
Kingdom-Animalia	
Phylum-Chordata	
Class-Actinopterygii	
Order-Cypriniformes	
Family-Cobitidae

Biology
The Cobitis marrocana is now recorded to be least concern. It now has a competitor species called the Lepomis spp. The competition has created a decline in the population of  the Cobitis marrocana. Another negative influence that could affect the population as well is the effect of pollution on the habitat of the Cobitis marrocana.

Size
The average size of an unsexed male is about 8 centimeters.

Location
It is found only in Morocco and Spain. It is known to be common to the rivers of Loukkos and Sebou, and it is also found in the Atlantic coast of northern Morocco. The climate that it is found in is temperate. It is common to highland and lowland freshwater.

Habitat
Its natural habitats are rivers and intermittent rivers.

References

Sources

Cobitis
Endemic fauna of Morocco
Fish described in 1929
Taxonomy articles created by Polbot